Naarda huettleri is a moth of the family Erebidae first described by Balázs Tóth and László Aladár Ronkay in 2015. It is found in Sri Lanka.

The adult wingspan is 11 mm. Forewings and hindwings are dark brownish gray in colour. Transverse line indistinct. Light yellowish reniform stigma is semilunar with large black spot at the bottom half. Orbicular stigma yellowish. In males, genitalia is uncus short and hooked. Saccus broad based. Juxta large, rounded triangular.

References

Moths of Asia
Moths described in 2015
Erebidae
Hypeninae